The DEAF1 transcription factor (HGNC:14677) (or "deformed epidermal autoregulatory factor 1 in Drosophila) is coded by DEAF1 at 11p15.5. It is a member of the Zinc finger protein and  MYND-type protein.

Pathology 
 Mutations affecting the SAND Domain of DEAF1 cause intellectual disability with severe speech impairment and behavioral troubles.

References

Transcription factors